Pseudoleucania brosii is a moth of the family Noctuidae. It is found in the Maule and Magallanes and Antartica Chilena Regions of Chile.

The wingspan is 32–35 mm. Adults are on wing in December.

External links
 Noctuinae of Chile

Noctuinae
Endemic fauna of Chile